Colin Dodd (25 May 1930 – 4 August 2009) was a former Australian rules footballer who played with Fitzroy in the Victorian Football League (VFL).

Notes

External links 
		

1930 births
2009 deaths
Australian rules footballers from Victoria (Australia)
Fitzroy Football Club players